Kehra pulp and paper mill is a pulp and paper mill in Kehra, Anija Parish, Estonia. The owner of the factory is Horizon Pulp & Paper Ltd.

Factories' facilities were built between 1937 and 1938 by construction company Vennad Edenbergid.

In 1950, a paper factory was also built next to the factory. In 1957, a paper bag workshop was built.

References

External links
 

Pulp and paper mills
Companies of Estonia
Anija Parish